Joan Marjorie Dingley  (14 May 1916 – 1 January 2008) was one of the pioneer women of New Zealand science. She worked for the DSIR Plant Diseases Division from 1941 to 1976, becoming the head of mycology. She was a major research scientist in New Zealand for both laboratory and field-based plant pathology, and for taxonomic mycology.

Life and career 
Her research interests lay with the taxonomy of ascomycetes, especially the Hypocreales. She rapidly became a world authority on these fungi. About 30 species of fungi have dingleyae as their species name, and the genus Dingleya was also named after her.

She wrote a major, comprehensive list of New Zealand plant diseases, Records of plant diseases in New Zealand, published in 1969.

Dingley developed the New Zealand Fungal Herbarium, building specimen numbers from 4,000 to 35,000 by the time she retired.

Dingley also had a love for horticulture and gardening. She was a prime mover in the establishment of the Auckland Regional Botanic Gardens, and became an honorary life member of the ‘Friends’ of the gardens.

Publications 

 Brien, R.M. et al. (1951) A revised list of plant diseases recorded in New Zealand / by R.M. Brien and Joan M. Dingley. Gisborne [N.Z.]: Te Rau Press (Bulletin (New Zealand. Department of Scientific and Industrial Research); no. 101).
 Dingley, J.M. et al. (1969) Records of plant diseases in New Zealand / by J.M. Dingley. Wellington, N.Z.: Govt. Printer (Bulletin (New Zealand. Department of Scientific and Industrial Research); 192).

Honours and awards 
Dingley was awarded an honorary DSc by Massey University in 1994. She was appointed an Officer of the Order of the British Empire in the 1995 Queen's Birthday Honours, for services to botany. In 2004, Landcare Research named one of its Auckland laboratories the JM Dingley Microbiology Laboratory in her honour. She attended the naming ceremony.

In 2017, Dingley was selected as one of the Royal Society Te Apārangi's "150 women in 150 words", celebrating the contributions of women to knowledge in New Zealand.

References
Landcare Research newsletter Tamaki News, #50, January 11, 2008, unpublished.

External links
National Library of New Zealand Kathleen Maisey Curtis & Theodore Rigg

1916 births
2008 deaths
20th-century New Zealand botanists
New Zealand Officers of the Order of the British Empire
New Zealand phytopathologists
Women phytopathologists
New Zealand mycologists
20th-century New Zealand women scientists
People associated with Department of Scientific and Industrial Research (New Zealand)
New Zealand women botanists
20th-century agronomists